Spilarctia zhangmuna is a moth in the family Erebidae. It was described by Cheng-Lai Fang in 1982. It is found in Yunnan and Tibet in western China.

References
Notes

Source

Z
Moths of Asia
Fauna of Tibet
Moths described in 1982